Matthew Stokys is the third recorded Registrary of the University of Cambridge.

He was born in Eton and went to school there before entering King's College, Cambridge in 1531. He graduated B.A. in 1536 and M.A. in 1539. He was a Fellow of King's from 1534 to 1548. He was Esquire Bedell from 1557 to 1585 and Registrary from 1558 until his death on 16 November 1591.

References

External links
 More online references

1591 deaths
Alumni of King's College, Cambridge
Fellows of King's College, Cambridge
Registraries of the University of Cambridge
People from Eton, Berkshire
People educated at Eton College